Giovanni Cazzulani (5 August 1909 – 22 October 1983) was an Italian cyclist. He competed in the individual road race event at the 1932 Summer Olympics. He finished in third place in the 1934 Giro d'Italia.

References

External links
 

1909 births
1983 deaths
Italian male cyclists
Olympic cyclists of Italy
Cyclists at the 1932 Summer Olympics
Cyclists from the Province of Cremona